Calyptranthera is a genus of plants in the family Apocynaceae, first described as a genus in 1996. The entire genus is endemic to Madagascar in the Indian Ocean.

Species

References

Secamonoideae
Apocynaceae genera
Endemic flora of Madagascar